The following elections occurred in 1965.

Africa
 1965 Basutoland general election
 1965 Bechuanaland general election
 1965 Burundian legislative election
 1965 Cameroonian presidential election
 1965 Democratic Republic of the Congo general election
 1965 Ethiopian general election
 1965 Ghanaian parliamentary election
 1965 Ivorian general election
 1965 Mauritanian parliamentary election
 1965 Nigerien parliamentary election
 1965 Nigerien presidential election
 1965 Rhodesian general election
 1965 Rwandan general election
 1965 Tanzanian general election
 1965 Sudanese parliamentary election
 1965 Upper Volta parliamentary election
 1965 Upper Volta presidential election

Asia
 1965 Afghan parliamentary election
 1965 Ceylonese parliamentary election
 1965 Israeli legislative election
 1965 Malagasy parliamentary election
 1965 Malagasy presidential election
 1965 Pakistani presidential election
 1965 Philippine House of Representatives elections
 1965 Philippine Senate election
 1965 Philippine general election
 1965 Philippine presidential election

Europe
 1965 Belgian general election
 1965 Irish general election
 1965 Norwegian parliamentary election
 1965 Portuguese legislative election
 1965 Polish legislative election
 1965 Turkish general election
 1965 West German federal election

France
 1965 French municipal elections
 1965 French presidential election

United Kingdom
 1965 Conservative Party leadership election
 1965 East Grinstead by-election
 1965 Leyton by-election
 1965 Northern Ireland general election
 1965 Roxburgh, Selkirk and Peebles by-election
 1965 Salisbury by-election

North America
 1965 British Honduras legislative election

Canada
 1965 Canadian federal election
 1965 Sudbury municipal election

Caribbean
 1965 Antigua and Barbuda general election

United States
 1965 New Orleans mayoral election
 1965 Pittsburgh mayoral election

South America 
 1965 Argentine legislative election
 1965 Chilean parliamentary election
 1965 Honduran Constituent Assembly election
 1965 Honduran presidential election

Oceania
 1965 Cook Islands general election

Australia
 1965 New South Wales state election
 1965 South Australian state election
 1965 Western Australian state election

See also

 
1965
Elections